Robert Blair "Robbie" Robinson (born 22 August 1989 in Westport, New Zealand) is a professional rugby union player who represents Toyota Industries Shuttles Aichi in the Japan.

Playing career
Robinson made his debut for Southland in round three 2008 Air New Zealand Cup against the Hawke's Bay Magpies. He played majority of his games at fullback rather than his favoured first five-eighth position due to the competition's top scorer Blair Stewart having cemented the role for the season.

In 2009 Robinson was selected for the New Zealand Under 20s team for the Junior World Cup in Japan. Robinson played the majority of the tournament at fullback due to the team's captain Aaron Cruden being a specialist first five-eighth. The team went through the tournament unbeaten, defeating England 44–28 in the final.

His season continued with Southland making a great start to the competition after being second after 8 rounds of the 2009 Air New Zealand Cup. However a string of bad performances led to the team needing to win their final round Ranfurly Shield challenge against Canterbury. The team came out of the game victorious with Robinson kicking three penalties leading the Stags to a win and ending the 50 year shield drought.

His form led to him securing a Highlanders contract for the 2010 and 2011 Super Rugby seasons. In 2012, after two years with the Highlanders, he signed with the Chiefs, with his contract extending until the 2014 season.

He scored the Chiefs' winning try in the 2013 Super Rugby final in a 27–22 win against the Brumbies.

He was released by the Chiefs in 2014 after a frustrating injury that kept him out for the entire campaign.

On June 24 2022, he was announced as having signed for the Southland Stags for the 2022 Bunnings NPC.

References

External links
 Chiefs profile
 itsrugby.co.uk profile

1989 births
Living people
Black Rams Tokyo players
Chiefs (rugby union) players
Expatriate rugby union players in Japan
Highlanders (rugby union) players
Māori All Blacks players
New Zealand expatriate rugby union players
New Zealand expatriate sportspeople in Japan
New Zealand rugby union players
North Harbour rugby union players
People educated at Southland Boys' High School
Rugby union fly-halves
Rugby union fullbacks
Rugby union players from Westport, New Zealand
Southland rugby union players
Sunwolves players
Toyota Industries Shuttles Aichi players
Toyota Verblitz players